Wellstedia socotrana is a species of plant in the family Boraginaceae. It is endemic to Yemen.

References

Endemic flora of Socotra
socotrana
Vulnerable plants
Taxonomy articles created by Polbot
Taxa named by Isaac Bayley Balfour